Michael Ray Burch (born February 19, 1958) is an American poet.

Life
Michael R. Burch (born February 19, 1958) is an American computer company executive, poet, columnist, essayist  and editor who lives in Nashville, Tennessee.

Also a peace activist, he is the author of the Burch-Elberry Peace Initiative, which has been published online by United Progressives and the National Forum of India. On October 21, 2010, Burch presented the Burch-Elberry Peace Initiative to Aziz Mekouar, the Moroccan Ambassador to the United States, at a reception held in the Grand Ballroom of Nashville's Vanderbilt Plaza hotel. Burch was also one of the featured speakers at a Freedom Walk for Palestinians held on October 10, 2009 in Nashville.

Burch has been very active in the poetry movements known as New Formalism and Neo-Romanticism. When Kevin N. Roberts founded and launched the poetry journal Romantics Quarterly, he selected five poems by Burch to lead off the premier issue (Winter 2001), and Burch had three or more poems in each of the first eight issues. Burch also encouraged contemporary formalists he had published, such as Richard Moore, Rhina Espaillat, Jack Butler, Annie Finch, A. E. Stallings and Harvey Stanbrough to contribute to Romantics Quarterly. After Romantics Quarterly ceased publication, Burch published a number of the journal's best poems through his literary website The HyperTexts , which has been online for two decades and according to Google Analytics has received more than 9.8 million page views since 2010. In addition to the poets named above, Burch has also published Jared Carter, R. S. Gwynn, Julie Kane, X. J. Kennedy, Jan Schreiber, Tom Merrill, Joseph S. Salemi and other formalist poets of note.

Burch's poems, essays, articles, and letters have appeared in publications such as TIME, USA Today, Writer's Digest, Writer's Journal, Writer's Gazette, The Lyric, Light Quarterly, Measure, Poet Lore, The Raintown Review, Trinacria, Ancient Cypress Press, The New Formalist, and hundreds of other literary journals. He had a weekly column in Nashville's City Paper, for three years until it folded in 2013. He is an editor and publisher of Holocaust, Hiroshima, Trail of Tears, Darfur and Nakba poetry. He has also translated poetry from Old English and other languages into modern English. Poets translated by Burch include Basho, Bertolt Brecht, Robert Burns, William Dunbar, Allama Iqbal, Ono no Komachi, Miklós Radnóti, Rainer Maria Rilke, Renée Vivien and Sappho.

Burch is married to Elizabeth Harris Burch, a singer and actress; they have a son, Jeremy Michael Burch, who is a musician, singer and actor.

Awards
Michael R. Burch has five Pushcart Prize nominations, from The Aurorean, Romantics Quarterly, The Raintown Review, Trinacria, and Victorian Violet Press. His poem "Ordinary Love" won the 2001 Algernon Charles Swinburne Poetry Award. Altogether, he has won seven poetry contests and received awards in 42 writing contests.
.

Published works
Books

Auschwitz Rose (forthcoming from Multicultural Books of British Columbia, Canada)

Awards

"Ordinary Love" won the 2001 Algernon Charles Swinburne poetry award
"In Flight Convergence" was nominated for the Pushcart Prize by The Aurorean
"Ordinary Love" was nominated for the Pushcart Prize by Romantics Quarterly
"Isolde's Song" was nominated for the Pushcart Prize by The Raintown Review
"Discrimination" was nominated for the Pushcart Prize by Trinacria
"Just Smile" was nominated for the Pushcart Prize by Victorian Violet Press
"For Rhonda, with Butterflies" was nominated for a Best of the Net by Victorian Violet Press

Anthologies

The Bible of Hell
How Sweet The Night (a poetry CD published by Romantics Quarterly)
Blood to Remember (anthology of Holocaust poetry)
Velvet Avalanche
Love Me Knots (a collection of 100 top contemporary love poems)
Voices Israel Anthology
There is Something in the Autumn
Captivating Poetry
The Book of Hope and Dreams
Washing the Color of Water Golden (Hurricane Katrina anthology)
listening to the birth of crystals
Sailing in the Mist of Time
The Best of The Eclectic Muse 1989-2003
Poems for Big Kids
Anthology of Contemporary American Poetry
Little Brown Poetry "Best of 2002 Anthology"
A Bouquet of Poems for children of all ages (published by The Lyric)
The Centrifugal Eye's Anniversary Anthology 2005-2010

Reviews
 Judy Jones interview with Michael R. Burch, On the Road with Judy
 Live Journal review of Michael R. Burch

References and External Links

References

External links
 Michael R. Burch, Bio and Poems at The HyperTexts
 Michael R. Burch, Early Poems
 The Wife's Lament translation
 Wulf and Eadwacer translation
 Haiku translations of Basho and other Oriental Masters
 Holocaust Poetry translations
 Miklos Radnoti translations
 Robert Burns translations
 Fowles in the Frith translation
 Urdu Poetry translations
 Michael Burch entry on the PoemHunter resource
 Russell Bittner interview with Michael Burch on Long Story Short Ezine
 

1958 births
Living people
American male poets
Poets from Tennessee
People from Nashville, Tennessee